Ally McLellan (16 April 1922 – September 2010) was a Scottish footballer who played as an inside forward in the Football League for New Brighton and Tranmere Rovers.

References

1922 births
2010 deaths
Footballers from Glasgow
Association football inside forwards
Scottish footballers
New Brighton A.F.C. players
Tranmere Rovers F.C. players
Morecambe F.C. players
English Football League players